Sinoderces is a genus of spiders from Thailand in the family Psilodercidae first described in 2017.

Species 
 it contains twelve species:

 Sinoderces aiensis F. Y. Li & S. Q. Li, 2019 – China
 Sinoderces dewaroopensis F. Y. Li & S. Q. Li, 2019 – Thailand
 Sinoderces exilis (Wang & Li, 2013) – China
 Sinoderces khanensis F. Y. Li & S. Q. Li, 2019 – Laos
 Sinoderces kieoensis F. Y. Li & S. Q. Li, 2019 – Laos
 Sinoderces luohanensis F. Y. Li & S. Q. Li, 2019 – China
 Sinoderces nawanensis F. Y. Li & S. Q. Li, 2017 – China
 Sinoderces phathaoensis F. Y. Li & S. Q. Li, 2019 – Laos
 Sinoderces saraburiensis F. Y. Li & S. Q. Li, 2019 – Thailand
 Sinoderces taichi F. Y. Li & S. Q. Li, 2019 – China
 Sinoderces wenshanensis F. Y. Li & S. Q. Li, 2019 – China
 Sinoderces xueae F. Y. Li & S. Q. Li, 2019 – China

References

Psilodercidae
Araneomorphae genera